New Providence is a New Jersey Transit station in New Providence, New Jersey along the Gladstone Branch of the Morris and Essex line. The original 1899 station, built by the Delaware, Lackawanna and Western Railroad still stands. New Providence station is located across from the intersection of Old Springfield Avenue and Division Avenue. Springfield Avenue was rerouted north of the station in 1931. The former segment of Springfield Avenue on the opposite side of the tracks has been turned into an additional parking lot.

The station was originally named West Summit until March 1927, as the borough of New Providence felt there was confusion for not being on railroad timetables. The station was renamed over the opposition of Summit residents.

Station layout
The station has one low-level side platform.

References

External links

NJ Transit Rail Operations stations
Railway stations in the United States opened in 1872
Former Delaware, Lackawanna and Western Railroad stations
1872 establishments in New Jersey